Holocarpha heermannii is a species of flowering plant in the family Asteraceae known by the common name Heermann's tarweed.  It is endemic to California.

Distribution
Holocarpha heermannii grows in the hills, mountains, and valleys of the central and southern part of California. It is most common in the Inner Coast Ranges in the eastern San Francisco Bay Area, the southern Sierra Nevada foothills, and the Tehachapi Mountains. It is also found in the Southern Outer California Coast Ranges and western Transverse Ranges.

Description
The stem is densely glandular and coated in short and long hairs.

The inflorescence is a spreading array of branches bearing clusters of flower heads. Each flower head is lined with phyllaries which are coated in large bulbous resin glands. They are hairy and sticky in texture. The head contains many yellow disc florets surrounded by three to 10 golden yellow ray florets.

The ray and fertile disc florets produce achenes of different shapes.

References

External links
Jepson Manual Treatment: Holocarpha heermannii
CalFlora Database: Holocarpha heermannii (Heermann's tarweed)
USDA Plants Profile: Holocarpha heermannii (Heermann's tarweed)
Holocarpha heermannii— U.C. Photos gallery

Madieae
Endemic flora of California
Flora of the Sierra Nevada (United States)
Natural history of the California chaparral and woodlands
Natural history of the California Coast Ranges
Natural history of the Transverse Ranges
~
Flora without expected TNC conservation status